TCA Raghavan  is a former Indian diplomat who was a 1982 batch officer of the Indian Foreign Service. He has considerable experience in South Asia policy issues and considered an expert on Pakistan studies, including heading the Joint Secretary the Division of the Ministry of External Affairs in Pakistan Afghanistan and Iran (PAI) division. From  till his retirement on  Raghavan was the High Commissioner of India to Pakistan. After retirement he has authored two books- the first a biography of two Mughal nobles and the other a study of India Pakistan relations. In July 2018 he was appointed Director General of the Indian Council of World Affairs.

Early life and background
Raghavan spent his childhood in Delhi, Bhopal and Jammu.  He finished school at Sardar Patel Vidyalaya and his college and university were at St. Stephen's College, Delhi University and Jawaharlal Nehru University, New Delhi. He joined the Indian Foreign Service in 1982. He was awarded a PhD by Jawaharlal Nehru University  in 1992 in history. His dissertation was on the Agrarian History of the Narmada Valley.

Career
Raghavan was the Indian high commissioner to Singapore till June 2013. After that, he was appointed the High commissioner to Pakistan. Earlier, Raghavan was a Deputy High Commissioner in Islamabad from 2003 to 2007. His previous overseas postings include United Kingdom (1995-1998), Bhutan (1992-1995) and Kuwait (1983-1986).

After his retirement he has emerged as a well known author with three well received books. The first is entitled Attendant Lords: Bairam Khan and Abdur Rahim, Courtiers and Poets in Mughal India. It was published by HarperCollins in 2017 and was awarded the Mohammad Habib Prize for medieval Indian history by the Indian History Congress in December 2017. His second book is also published by HarperCollins and is entitled The People Next Door: The Curious History of India's Relations with Pakistan. His latest book is entitled History Men: Jadunath Sarkar, G S Sardesai, Raghubir Sinh and their Quest for India's Past (HarperCollins, 2020).

Personal life
Raghavan is married to Ranjana Raghavan. They have two daughters.

Bibliography

References

External links
 

High Commissioners of India to Singapore
High Commissioners of India to Pakistan
1955 births
Living people
Jawaharlal Nehru University alumni
Indian scholars of Pakistan studies
Historians of Pakistan
Writers about Pakistan